= Robb Dunphy =

Philosophy professor

Academic background
- Education: University of Sussex (PhD)
- Thesis: Scepticism and Presuppositionlessness: Hegel and the Problem of Beginning (2018)

Academic work
- Institutions: University of Sussex
- Website: www.robbdunphy.com

Robb Dunphy is a professor of philosophy at the University of Sussex.

== Life and works ==
=== Selected publications ===
- Robb Dunphy (2023). Hegel And The Problem Of Beginning: Scepticism And Presuppositionlessness.

==== Editorials ====
- Dunphy, Robb; Lovat, Toby (4 August 2023). Metaphysics as a Science in Classical German Philosophy (1 ed.). New York: Routledge. doi:10.4324/9781003187561. ISBN 978-1-003-18756-1.

==== Articles ====
- Dunphy, Robb (2023). "The Beginning of Hegel's Logic". Philosophy Compass. 18 (5) e12918. doi:10.1111/phc3.12918. ISSN 1747-9991.
